Isaac Overton Pearson (March 1, 1917 – March 17, 1985) was an American professional baseball pitcher who appeared in 164 games in the Major Leagues for the Philadelphia Phillies (1939–1942; 1946) and Chicago White Sox (1948). He signed with the Phillies off the campus of the University of Mississippi, and was a World War II veteran of the United States Marine Corps.

Pearson compiled a lowly .206 winning percentage during his Major League career, but he pitched for some of the worst teams of his era. His Phillies clubs lost 106 (1939), 103 (1940), 111 (1941), and 109 (1942) games, and his White Sox team dropped 101 games (1948). He did appear in five games for the 1946 Phillies, who lost only 85 of 154 games that season.  He is also known for having severely beaned star Brooklyn Dodgers outfielder Pete Reiser on April 23, 1941 — one of a series of injuries that derailed Reiser's promising career. Pearson led the National League in hit batsmen that season.

Pearson, a swingman who served as both a starting pitcher and a reliever, also led the NL in games finished that year, and compiled six saves, fourth in the league. All told he surrendered 611 hits and 268 bases on balls in 559 MLB innings pitched, with 149 strikeouts.

Pearson was buried at the Memphis National Cemetery.

References

External links

1917 births
1985 deaths
Baseball players from Mississippi
Chattanooga Lookouts players
Chicago White Sox players
Columbus Red Birds players
Major League Baseball pitchers
Memphis Chickasaws players
Minneapolis Millers (baseball) players
Philadelphia Phillies players
Seattle Rainiers players
Mississippi Delta Trojans baseball players
Ole Miss Rebels baseball players
United States Marine Corps personnel of World War II